India women's national football team started playing in the late 1970s. Their first major tournament was 1980 AFC Women's Championship. In the next edition of the tournament in 1981, the first ever hat-trick (three or more goals in a match) for India was scored by Shanti Mullick. She scored 4 goals in a 5−0 victory over Singapore on 8 June 1981. She was also the first player to score more than three goals in a match for India. In the 1981 edition two hat-tricks were scored, the second one was scored by Shukla Nag in an 8−0 win over Philippines. As of 1 March 2019, 14 different players scored 25 hat-tricks for India.

2010 South Asian Games−football tournament was the first tournament where three different players scored hat-trick for India. Mandakini Devi scored against Sri Lanka, Bembem Devi scored against Pakistan and Naobi Chanu scored against Bangladesh, which helped India to reach the final of the tournament and eventually they won the gold medal. The first player to have scored double hat-trick (six goals) in a single match for India was Sasmita Malik. She scored 7 goals in an 18−0 victory over Bhutan at the 2010 SAFF Women's Championship, which is India's biggest win till date. Along with Malik, Bala Devi and Tababi Devi also scored hat-trick in that match, thus became most number of hat-tricks scored in a single match by Indian players. In the same tournament, Bala Devi scored three hat-tricks, the most by any Indian in a single tournament. She scored one each against Bhutan, Bangladesh and Pakistan. Bala Devi went on to score 8 hat-tricks in her international career, the most by an Indian. Other than Shanti Mullick, Bembem Devi, Sasmita Malik and Kamala Devi scored two hat-tricks for the national team. The most recent hat-trick was scored by Anju Tamang in a 9−0 victory over Maldives at the 2022 SAFF Women's Championship on 10 September 2022.

Hat-tricks for India

Result in the table lists India's goal tally first

See also 

India women's national football team results

References

External links
 

India
India
hat-tricks
National